Farm to Market Roads in Texas are owned and maintained by the Texas Department of Transportation (TxDOT).

FM 1200

Farm to Market Road 1200 (FM 1200) is located in Cooke County.

FM 1200 begins at FM 1201 in western Gainesville near Gainesville Municipal Airport. The highway travels northwest before state maintenance ends south of South Fish Creek. The roadway continues as County Road 460 towards Marysville.

The section between US 82 and FM 1201 was transferred to the latter route on February 6, 1953. FM 1200 was extended  northwestward on July 11, 1968.

FM 1201

Farm to Market Road 1201 (FM 1201) is located in Cooke County.

FM 1201 begins at an intersection with US 82 in western Gainesville. The highway travels in a north-northwest direction near the eastern border of Gainesville Municipal Airport and intersects FM 1200 before leaving the city limits. After leaving Gainesville, FM 1201 travels through rural farm areas until reaching the Moss Lake area. In the Moss Lake area, the highway sees more development along its route and passes near a few rural subdivisions. After leaving the Moss Lake area, FM 1201 runs closely to the Red River and travels through Sivells Bend. The highway ends just north of Sivells Bend, with state maintenance ending south of County Road 406; the roadway continues north as County Road 403.

A spur route was designated on March 2, 1967, along the highway's old location near Moss Lake.

Junction list

FM 1202

Farm to Market Road 1202 (FM 1202) is located in Cooke County.

FM 1202 begins at an intersection with FM 1201. The highway travels in a northeast direction then turns southeast at Lake Lane before turning east at County Road 444. FM 1202 enters Gainesville before ending at I-35 near an outlet center.

FM 1202 was designated on July 14, 1949, along the current route.

FM 1203

Farm to Market Road 1203 (FM 1203) is located in Live Oak County.

FM 1203 begins at an intersection with the northbound frontage road of I-37 south of Oakville. The highway travels in a northeastern direction, turns east, then turns southeast near a county road. FM 1203 continues to run in a southeastern direction before ending at an intersection with FM 799.

The current FM 1203 was designated on October 31, 1958, running from SH 9 (now I-37) near Oakville, eastward and southeastward to FM 799.

FM 1203 (1949)

FM 1203 was cancelled and combined with FM 678 on October 18, 1954.

FM 1204

Farm to Market Road 1204 (FM 1204) is located in Wise County.

FM 1204 begins at the intersection of County Roads 2646 and 2745. The highway travels in a southeastern direction and turns to the southwest at Greenwood then turns back southeast at Greenwood Road. FM 1204 continues to run southeast before ending at an intersection with FM 51 northeast of Decatur.

The current FM 1204 was designated on June 25, 1952, along the current route. The highway follows a former routing of FM 455. A portion was FM 1657.

FM 1204 (1949)

The highway was cancelled on January 3, 1952, with the mileage being transferred to FM 209.

FM 1205

FM 1205 (1949)

The original FM 1205 was designated on July 14, 1949, from US 287 at Iowa Park south 2 miles to FM 367. FM 1205 was cancelled on February 6, 1953, and transferred to FM 368.

FM 1206

FM 1207

FM 1208

FM 1208 (1949)

The original FM 1208 was designated on July 14, 1949, from US 283 near Beaver Creek east  to a road intersection. FM 1208 was cancelled on July 28, 1955, and transferred to FM 1763.

FM 1209

FM 1209 (1949)

The original FM 1209 was designated on July 14, 1949, from SH 51, 5.1 miles north of Crane, south and east 5.8 miles to SH 51, 2.5 miles north of Crane. FM 1209 was cancelled on September 28, 1950, in exchange for creation of FM 1601.

FM 1210

FM 1210 (1949)

The original FM 1210 was designated on July 14, 1949, from US 80 at Badger south and east  to a paved county road. FM 1210 was cancelled on February 28, 1951, and removed from the highway system.

FM 1211

Farm to Market Road 1211 (FM 1211) was located in Loving and Winkler counties. No highway currently uses the FM 1211 designation.

On December 17, 1952, the road was extended northeast  to the Winkler County line. That same day the road was extended northeast  to SH 115 1 mile west of Wink. On December 1, 1953, the road was signed (but not designated) as part of SH 302. FM 1211 was cancelled on August 29, 1990, after which it was officially transferred to SH 302.

FM 1212

FM 1213

FM 1214

Farm to Market Road 1214 (FM 1214) is located in Henderson County in Caney City.

FM 1214 begins at Barron Road north of Wingham Road. The highway travels in a predominately northern direction before turning east at Thomas Drive. FM 1214 travels near the shore of Cedar Creek Reservoir before ending at an intersection with SH 198.

The current FM 1214 was designated on January 22, 1958, running from FM 316 (now SH 198) to St. Paul's School.

FM 1214 (1949)

The highway was extended  southward on December 17, 1952. FM 1214 was extended to US 90 near Marathon on September 29, 1954. The highway was cancelled and re-designated as SH 51 on November 24, 1956, at TxDOT proposed a U.S. Highway on this corridor.

FM 1215

Farm to Market Road 1215 (FM 1215) is located in southwestern Reeves County. It begins along the north frontage road of I-10. The two-lane road proceeds first to the north, then makes turns to the east and north into Saragosa, where it is known as West Main Street, before making one more eastward turn to SH 17. FM 1215 runs south concurrently with SH 17 for  before turning east at CR 306, following that road for  before ending at an intersection with CR 309. CR 306 continues an additional mile to FM 2448.

FM 1215 was designated along its present route on July 14, 1949.

Junction list

FM 1216

Farm to Market Road 1216 (FM 1216) is located in northeastern Reeves County, and connects US 285 in Pecos northward to the location of a former school. The road has an intersection with FM 3398.

FM 1216 begins at US 285 on the northern edge of Pecos. The two-lane road proceeds to the north  to FM 3398. The road continues an additional  before state maintenance ends. The roadway continues to the northeast as Reeves County Road 425, which ends at SH 302. The path of FM 1216 is roughly parallel to the Pecos River to the east.

The route was extended along the remainder of its current length to the site of the former Patrole School on December 18, 1951.

Junction list

FM 1217

Farm to Market Road 1217 (FM 1217) was located in Pecos and Terrell counties. No highway currently uses the FM 1217 designation. It is now a portion of SH 349.

FM 1218

Farm to Market Road 1218 (FM 1218) is located in Winkler and Andrews counties. It begins in Winkler County at FM 874 northeast of Kermit. It runs to the north, mainly along the New Mexico state line, and enters Andrews County before ending at SH 128.

FM 1218 was designated on December 18, 1951, from FM 874 to the Andrews County line. It was extended to is current northern terminus at FM 781 (now SH 128) on December 17, 1952.

FM 1218 (1949)

This route was cancelled on December 18, 1951, and removed from the state highway system.

FM 1219

FM 1220

Farm to Market Road 1220 (FM 1220) is located in Tarrant County.

FM 1220 begins at an intersection with SH 183 in the Far Greater Northside area of Fort Worth. The highway travels in a northwestern direction along Azle Avenue through a residential area and runs along the northern edge of Sansom Park before entering Lake Worth. In Lake Worth, FM 1220 has a junction with I-820 and turns north onto Boat Club Road near Lake Worth High School. The highway travels in a northern direction near several subdivisions, running between Lake Worth and Marine Creek Reservoir, before re-entering Fort Worth near Saginaw. FM 1220 continues to run near several subdivisions in far northwest Fort Worth and turns west north of an intersection with Park Drive, then enters the town of Eagle Mountain. The highway runs through the town and runs close to Eagle Mountain Lake. West of Eagle Mountain, the Boat Club Road designation leaves the highway, with FM 1220's local designation becoming Morris Dido Newark Road. The highway runs in a northwestern direction near the eastern shore of Eagle Mountain Lake with state maintenance ending at Peden Road at the southern boundary of Pecan Acres; Morris Dido Newark Road continues past Peden Road for another  to FM 718 near Newark.

The highway was extended  northwestward on October 13, 1954. FM 1220 was extended  to its current northern terminus on September 27, 1960. The section of highway between SH 183 and I-820 was internally re-designated as Urban Road 1220 by TxDOT in 1995.

Junction list

FM 1220 (1949)

The original FM 1220 was designated on July 14, 1949, from SH 115 at Wink southeast 7.8 miles to a road intersection. FM 1220 was cancelled on February 28, 1951, and removed from the state highway system in exchange for extending FM 874 southwest from SH 82 (now SH 18) to SH 115.

FM 1220 (1951)

The second FM 1220 was designated on June 21, 1951, from US 281 in Falfurrias east and north to SH 285. This route was cancelled on June 23, 1953, but was restored on December 2, 1953, as FM 2191.

RM 1221

Ranch to Market Road 1221 (RM 1221) is located in eastern Kimble and Menard counties. The route's southern terminus is at a junction with US 377 northeast of London. RM 1221 travels due north to an intersection with RM 1773 before curving slightly to the northeast. It ends at a junction with  SH 29 in Hext.

The route was designated as Farm to Market Road 1221 on July 14, 1949, along the current route. It was redesignated RM 1221 on November 13, 1959.
Junction list

RM 1222

Ranch to Market Road 1222 (RM 1222) is located in Mason County. It runs from SH 29 near Mason north and east to RM 386 near Fredonia.

The route was designated on July 14, 1949, as Farm to Market Road 1222 (FM 1222), running from US 87 at Camp Air east  via Katemcy to FM 386 (now RM 386). It was redesignated RM 1222 on October 1, 1956.

FM 1223

Farm to Market Road 1223 (FM 1223) is located in Tom Green County.

State maintenance for FM 1223 begins on Susan Peak Road south of the main entrance to Rocking Chair Ranch. The highway travels northwest through rural farm and ranch land and has a junction with US 87/Loop 306 west of Wall. After the junction with US 87/Loop 306, FM 1223 continues to run in a northwest direction and enters San Angelo near an intersection with FM 765. The highway turns west at Old Eola Road near Goodfellow Air Force Base, turns northwest at Loop 378, then turns north near the South Concho River. After crossing the river, FM 1233 travels in a northern direction and closely parallels the river before ending at an intersection with FM 388. The section of highway within San Angelo is known locally as Chadbourne Street.

The highway was extended  over the old location of US 87 to the current location of US 87 at Loop 306 on November 1, 1962. The highway was extended  southeastward on July 11, 1968. FM 1223 was extended over the old location of US 87 between Loop 306 and Loop 378 on February 10, 1972. On November 3, 1972, the highway was extended  southeastward to US 83 near Menard, absorbing FM 3142. The section of FM 1223 in Menard County was cancelled on January 9, 1984, with part of the old highway being re-designated as FM 3463. The highway was extended  northwestward from Loop 378 to FM 388 on March 29, 1988, absorbing the northern part of Loop 378. The section of FM 1223 between US 87 and FM 388 was internally re-designated as Urban Road 1223 by TxDOT on June 27, 1995.

Junction list

FM 1224

FM 1225

FM 1226

FM 1227

FM 1227 (1949)

The original FM 1227 was designated on July 14, 1949, from US 83, 1 mile south of Anson, south  to a road intersection. On May 23, 1951, the road was extended south  to FM 605. FM 1227 was cancelled on February 20, 1952, and transferred to FM 707.

FM 1228

FM 1229

FM 1230

FM 1231

Farm to Market Road 1231 (FM 1231) was located in Kent and Scurry counties. No highway currently uses the FM 1231 designation.

FM 1231 was designated on July 14, 1949, from US 84 at Snyder north  to a road intersection. On June 21, 1951, the road was extended north  to the Kent County line. On April 29, 1952, the road was extended to US 380, 4 miles west of Clairemont, replacing FM 1741. On February 23, 1956, FM 1231 was signed, but not designated, as SH 208. FM 1231 was cancelled on August 29, 1990, as the extension of the SH 208 designation became official.

FM 1232

FM 1232 (1949)

The original FM 1232 was designated on July 14, 1949, from US 283 at Moran north  to a road intersection. FM 1232 was cancelled on January 14, 1952, and transferred to FM 576.

FM 1233

FM 1233 (1949)

The original FM 1233 was designated on July 14, 1949, from SH 351 northeast of Abilene north  to the Jones County line. On May 23, 1951, the road was extended north  to Lake Fort Phantom Hill Dam. FM 1233 was cancelled seven months later and became a portion of FM 1082.

FM 1234

FM 1234 (1949)

The original FM 1234 was designated on July 14, 1949, from SH 351 near Abilene south  to new US 80. FM 1234 was cancelled on July 31, 1962, and removed from the highway system because it was inside Abilene city limits and Loop 322 was planned to extend north to I-20 on parallel road. In 1992, surplus parts of the right-of-way were quitclaimed to Taylor County.

FM 1235

FM 1236

Farm to Market Road 1236 (FM 1236) is located in Fort Bend County. It begins at FM 442 south of Needville and goes northwest and then northeast before ending at SH 36 in Needville.

A two-lane highway for its entire length, FM 1236 begins at a stop sign on FM 442 south of Needville. This section of FM 1236, which is also named Bushnell Road, crosses Buffalo Creek. At Needville Four Corners Road, FM 1236 curves to the northeast and goes  to Altimore Road on the edge of Needville. The highway continues in the same direction through Needville for  before coming to a traffic signal at FM 360. The portion of FM 1236 within Needville is also called School Street. The section from FM 360 to the end of the highway at the SH 36 traffic light is an additional . On the other side of SH 36, School Street continues to the northeast and becomes Old Needville Fairchild Road, but is not part of the state highway system.

FM 1236 was redesignated on October 31, 1958, to begin at FM 442 and head northwest then northeast to end at SH 36 in Needville.

Junction list

FM 1236 (1949)

The highway was entirely within Bell County. In effect this extended FM 1236  to the west from Bartlett through Jarrell to SH 195 at Florence in Williamson County. On January 7, 1955, FM 1236 was canceled and its right-of-way was transferred to FM 487.

FM 1237

FM 1238

FM 1239

FM 1240

FM 1241

FM 1242

FM 1243

FM 1244

FM 1245

FM 1246

FM 1247

FM 1248

FM 1249

Farm to Market Road 1249 (FM 1249) runs from US 259 Bus. in Kilgore east to SH 322 near Lakeport.

FM 1249 was designated from US 259 (now Business US 259) to SH 322 on July 14, 1949. On January 26, 1965, FM 1249 was extended over the old location of SH 322, completing its current route.

Junction list

FM 1250

Farm to Market Road 1250 (FM 1250) is located in Medina County in the town of Hondo and is known locally as 30th Street.

FM 1250 begins at an intersection with US 90 in the western part of the town. The highway travels in an eastern direction through rural parts of the town until an intersection with Avenue U. East of Avenue U, FM 1250 travels through a residential area before ending at an intersection with FM 462 near Medina Community Hospital.

The current FM 1250 was designated on May 5, 1966, along the current route.

FM 1250 (1949)

The highway was cancelled on October 30, 1961, when FM 85 was rerouted over it.

FM 1251

FM 1252

Farm to Market Road 1252 (FM 1252) runs from FM 757 near its intersection with I-20 east to SH 31 near Kilgore. It is parallel to I-20 for its entire length.

FM 1252 was designated on July 14, 1949, from FM 757 to the Gregg County Line. On May 23, 1951, FM 1252 was extended east to SH 31.

Junction list

FM 1253

FM 1254

FM 1255

FM 1256

FM 1257

FM 1257 (1949)

The first use of the FM 1257 designation was in Van Zandt County, from US 80 in Edgewood to SH 64 at Canton. FM 1257 was cancelled two months later and transferred to FM 859.

FM 1257 (1951)

The next use of the FM 1257 designation was in Pecos County, from FM 305 northeast  to SH 51, 4 miles northwest of Iraan. FM 1257 was cancelled on June 30, 1977, and redesignated as US 190, although this did not take effect until 1978.

FM 1258

FM 1259

FM 1260

FM 1261

FM 1262

FM 1263

FM 1263 (1949)

The first use of the FM 1263 designation was in Hemphill County, from US 83, 1 mile north of the Wheeler County line, west  to a road intersection. FM 1263 was cancelled on December 17, 1952, and transferred to FM 1268.

FM 1263 (1952)

The next use of the FM 1263 designation was in Washington County, from FM 389 southwest of Brenham southwest  to the Austin County line. FM 1263 was cancelled on May 11, 1953, and transferred to FM 332.

FM 1264

Farm to Market Road 1264 (FM 1264) is located in Lubbock County. The section of highway within the city limits of Lubbock is known locally as North University Avenue.

FM 1264 begins at an intersection with U.S. Highway 84 (US 84, Clovis Road) in northwest Lubbock; the road continues past here as University Avenue. The highway travels between the Conquistador and Llano Estacado Lakes and runs near the Lubbock County Juvenile Justice Center before meeting Loop 289. Just north of Loop 289, FM 1264 runs past the Lubbock State School and a subdivision before leaving the city limits of Lubbock. Just north of the Lubbock city limits, the highway has an intersection with FM 2641. The rest of FM 1264's route is generally rural before reaching its northern terminus at FM 597 west of Abernathy.

The current FM 1264 was designated on December 17, 1952, running from US 84 north to FM 1294. On June 2, 1967, the highway was extended farther north to FM 597. On June 27, 1995, the section of FM 1264 between US 84 and FM 2641 was designated as Urban Road 1264 by TxDOT, but on November 15, 2018, this section was changed back to FM 1264.

Junction list

FM 1264 (1949)

An earlier FM 1264 was designated on July 14, 1949, from FM 279 (now FM 281) east of SH 117 (now SH 207), southeast to the Roberts County Line. This was cancelled as it was found to be a duplication of part of FM 279, and was removed from the designated highway system on May 30, 1950, in exchange for the designation of FM 1598.

FM 1265

Farm to Market Road 1265 (FM 1265) was located in Lipscomb County. It is now SH 23.

FM 1266

Farm to Market Road 1266 (FM 1266) is located in Galveston County. It runs from FM 517 in Dickinson north to FM 646 (future SH 99).

FM 1266 was designated in 1954 (authorized February 21, 1952, but road was not numbered until designation) from SH 146 south of Kemah southwest and south 6.3 miles to FM 517 at Dickinson. On April 1, 1968, the section from SH 146 to new FM 518 was transferred to FM 518. On April 1, 1987, a 1 mile section from FM 518 north to FM 2094 was added. On June 30, 1995, the entire route was transferred to UR 1266. On May 29, 2003, the sections from FM 518 to SH 96 and SH 96 to FM 646 were removed from the highway system and turned over to League City and a proposed section from FM 2094 to FM 518 was also removed.

FM 1266 (1949)

The original FM 1266 was designated on July 14, 1949, from US 287 at Etter east  to an intersection with FM 119 at Sunray. FM 1266 was cancelled on December 7, 1953, and transferred to FM 281.

FM 1267

FM 1268

FM 1269

FM 1269 (1949)

The original FM 1269 was designated on July 14, 1949, from FM 289, 17.6 miles east of Stratford, north  to a road intersection. Four months later the road was extended north  to the Oklahoma state line. FM 1269 was cancelled on September 17, 1952, and transferred to FM 119 (now FM 1290).

FM 1270

FM 1271

FM 1272

FM 1273

Farm to Market Road 1273 (FM 1273) is located in Kerr County in the Hill Country area. The highway is known locally as Upper Turtle Creek Road.

State maintenance for FM 1273 begins near the intersection of Upper Turtle Creek Road and Pikes Peak Road. The highway snakes its way through hilly terrain and runs parallel to Turtle Creek in an area with several lodges and camps. FM 1273 ends at an intersection with SH 16 southwest of Kerrville.

The westernmost  of the highway was turned over to Kerr County for maintenance on June 24, 1953.

FM 1273 (1949)

The highway was cancelled and combined with FM 1280 on December 18, 1951.

FM 1274

FM 1274 (1949)

The original FM 1274 was designated on July 14, 1949, from US 59 near Garrison south  to a road intersection. On May 23, 1951, a  section from SH 7 in Martinsville to a road intersection was added, creating a gap. On December 17, 1952, the road was extended south and southwest  to SH 21 near Chireno, closing the gap and replacing FM 1863. On November 21, 1956, the road was extended south  from Loop 34 and a break in the route was added at Martinsville. On October 31, 1957, the road was extended south  to SH 103. FM 1274 was cancelled on June 18, 1964, and transferred to FM 95.

FM 1275

FM 1276

FM 1277

FM 1278

FM 1278 (1949)

The original FM 1278 was designated on July 14, 1949, from SH 87 at Hurstown east  to a road intersection. On September 28, 1950, the road was extended north  to Strong School. FM 1278 was cancelled on October 28, 1953, and transferred to FM 139.

FM 1279

FM 1280

Farm to Market Road 1280 (FM 1280) is located in Houston and Trinity counties.

FM 1280 begins in the unincorporated community of Ash in Houston County, at the intersection of County Roads 3190 and 3220. The route proceeds to the east, curving to the southeast to intersect  SH 21 in Austonio. It curves back toward the east, passing through the former town of Pearson Chapel, where it intersects  FM 3151, before meeting  FM 230 and  SH 19 in Lovelady. FM 1280 passes Holly before dipping into Trinity County, where it provides access to the communities of Zion Hill and Friday. The route reaches its eastern terminus at a junction with  US 287 within the boundaries of the Davy Crockett National Forest shortly thereafter.

It was extended further west Lovelady on November 20, 1951, replacing FM 1273, which went from SH 45 (now SH 19) east 3.5 miles. On October 13, 1954, FM 1280 was extended 6.3 miles to Pearsons Chapel. On November 21, 1956, FM 1280 was extended west to Ash, replacing  FM 1732 which started at SH 21.

Junction list

FM 1281

 Originally RM 1281.

FM 1281 (1949)

The original FM 1281 was designated on July 14, 1949, from US 75 at Howe east  to Tom Bean. On December 17, 1952, the road was extended east  to US 69. In February 1955 the road was extended east 8.8 miles to Randolph, replacing the short-lived FM 2303 and a break in the route was added at US 69. On October 31, 1958, the road was extended east to Bailey. On December 5, 1958, an 8 mile section from Tom Bean west to Howe was transferred to FM 902 and FM 1281 was instead rerouted northwest to FM 697 over FM 2321, replacing it. FM 1281 was also extended southeast to Commerce, replacing FM 2320. FM 1281 was cancelled on December 17, 1970, and transferred to SH 11.

FM 1282

FM 1282 (1949)

The original FM 1282 was designated on July 14, 1949, from US 82 north  to Sadler. On October 28, 1953, the road was extended north  to a road intersection. On October 31, 1957, the road was extended north  to FM 901 at Gordonville. FM 1282 was cancelled on January 17, 1958, and transferred to FM 901.

RM 1282

RM 1282 was designated on October 31, 1958, from SH 29 some 11 miles northwest of Mason northeast 4.3 miles to Ranch Branch School. RM 1282 was cancelled on May 24, 1962, and transferred to RM 1222.

FM 1283

Farm to Market Road 1283 (FM 1283) is located in Bandera and Medina counties in the Hill Country. It runs near the eastern shore of Medina Lake.

FM 1283 begins at FM 471 west of San Antonio. The highway runs roughly to the northwest before turning northward at County Road 271, which provides access to Mico. FM 1283 follows the eastern shore of Medina Lake to Lakehills, where it intersects PR 37. After leaving the town, the highway enters Bandera Falls, then runs to the northeast before ending at SH 16 in Pipe Creek.

The current FM 1283 was designated in Bandera County on August 22, 1951, running from SH 16 at Pipe Creek south  to a county road. It was extended south to PR 37 on October 31, 1957, and to the Medina County line on May 2, 1962. It was extended to its current terminus at FM 471 on May 7, 1970, replacing RM 1608.

Junction list

FM 1283 (1949)

A previous route numbered FM 1283 was designated in Grayson County on July 14, 1949, from US 69 east to the Fannin County line. It was combined with FM 898 on August 22, 1951.

FM 1284

FM 1284 (1949)

The original FM 1284 was designated on July 14, 1949, from SH 10 (now US 377) at Tioga to a point  miles east. FM 1284 was cancelled on December 17, 1952, and transferred to FM 121.

FM 1285

FM 1286

FM 1287

FM 1288

Farm to Market Road 1288 (FM 1288) is located in Clay County.

FM 1288 begins north of Newport, at an intersection with  SH 59. It travels to the north through the farming areas of southeastern Clay County, through the community of Vashti, to Bellevue and US 287, the main thoroughfare in the region. After a brief concurrency with US 287, the route continues north about  before state maintenance ends. The roadway continues as Worsham Road under county jurisdiction before it eventually becomes  FM 1134.

FM 1288 is a two-lane route for its entire length, except for the section that is concurrent with US 287 in Bellevue.

FM 1288 was first designated in neighboring Montague County on July 14, 1949; the route traveled westward from US 287 near Bowie to the Clay County line. The section from Bellevue to Vashti was originally designated  FM 176 until FM 176 was replaced by an extension of  FM 174; after the designation of FM 1288 was extended on December 17, 1952, to Vashti and then southward to SH 59, the state effectively swapped the designations of the two segments, eliminating the 90-degree bend in FM 174 and removing FM 1288 from Montague County. On October 31, 1958, FM 1288 was extended north . On November 24, 1959, FM 1288 was extended north  to its current terminus.

Junction list

FM 1289

FM 1290

Farm to Market Road 1290 (FM 1290) is located in Sherman County. It runs from the Oklahoma state line to SH 15 (former FM 289).

FM 1290 was designated on June 9, 1964, on the current route as a replacement of a section of FM 119.

FM 1290 (1949)

The original FM 1290 was designated on July 14, 1949, from FM 155 south of Weimar west  to Oakland. FM 1290 was cancelled on July 29, 1963, and transferred to FM 532.

FM 1291

FM 1292

FM 1292 (1949)

The original FM 1292 was designated on July 14, 1949, from US 90 in Schulenburg south  to the Lavaca County line. FM 1292 was cancelled on November 25, 1958, and transferred to FM 957.

FM 1293

FM 1293 (1949)

The original FM 1293 was designated on July 14, 1949, from SH 237 at Round Top  to Quade School. FM 1293 was cancelled on December 17, 1952, and transferred to FM 1457.

FM 1294

Farm to Market Road 1294 (FM 1294) is located in Hockley and Lubbock counties.

FM 1294 begins at an intersection with US 385 between Whitharral and Levelland. The highway travels through rural areas of northern Hockley County, intersecting FM 2646 and FM 168 and has an overlap with FM 2130 before entering Lubbock County near FM 2378. FM 1294 intersects US 84 and Loop 388 near Shallowater. The highway runs near the northern boundary of Shallowater along 12th Street and exits the town near Avenue Q and resumes its rural route. FM 1294 intersects FM 2528 and FM 1264 north of Lubbock and has a junction with I-27/US 87 near Lubbock Preston Smith International Airport and briefly travels through northern Lubbock east of I-27/US 87. After leaving Lubbock, the highway travels in an eastern direction before ending at an intersection with FM 1729.

The remainder of FM 2395 became part of FM 168 on November 24, 1959. FM 1294 was extended to its current eastern terminus at FM 1729 on November 5, 1971.

Junction list

FM 1294 (1949)

The highway was extended  to another road intersection on May 23, 1951. FM 1294 was cancelled on December 17, 1952, with the mileage being transferred to FM 609.

FM 1295

FM 1296

FM 1297

Farm to Market Road 1297 (FM 1297) is located in Bowie County in Texarkana. The highway is known locally as McKnight Road.

FM 1297 begins at an intersection with FM 2878 in the Pleasant Grove area of the city. The highway travels in an eastern direction and passes Pleasant Grove High School before ending at an intersection with FM 559.

The current FM 1297 was designated on June 28, 1963, running from FM 2878 to FM 559. The entire highway was internally re-designated as Urban Road 1297 by TxDOT on June 27, 1995, but was redesignated back to FM 1297 on November 15, 2018.

FM 1297 (1949)

The highway was extended  northwestward to Monthalia on May 23, 1951. FM 1297 was extended  northwestward of Monthalia to a road intersection on November 21, 1956. The highway was extended to SH 80 near Belmont on September 27, 1960. FM 1297 was extended to the Guadalupe County line on September 20, 1961. The highway was cancelled on May 24, 1962, with the mileage being transferred to FM 466.

FM 1298

FM 1298 (1949)

The original FM 1298 was designated on July 14, 1949, from US 77, 2.5 miles southwest of Hallettsville, north  to a road intersection. FM 1298 was cancelled on October 28, 1953, and transferred to FM 340.

FM 1299

Farm to Market Road 1299 (FM 1299) is located in Wharton County. It runs from SH 60 southeast of Wharton to another point on SH 60 in Wharton.

FM 1299 was designated on July 14, 1949, on the current route. On October 28, 1991, a  section along East Avenue in Wharton was turned over to the city and county.

Notes

References

+12
Farm to market roads 1200
Farm to Market Roads 1200